Operation Magali (French: Opération Magali) is a 1953 French thriller film directed by László V. Kish and starring Raymond Souplex, Nicole Maurey and Germaine Montero. It is based on the 1951 novel Operation Magali by Maurice Dekobra. It was shot at the Victorine Studios in Nice. The film's sets were designed by the art director Aimé Bazin.

Synopsis
Magali is the moll of a gang leader, but jealous of his behaviour towards a younger woman she threatens to go the police and inform about his activities. The gangster wants her silenced and turns to Mario, a retired criminal, to do the hit. Reluctantly he agrees but approaches the police for help, who advise him to play along with the scheme. When Magali is then found murdered, suspicion naturally turns to Mario.

Cast
 Raymond Souplex as 	Commissaire Paoli
 André Le Gall as 	Mario Boulard
 Nicole Maurey as 	Manon
 Germaine Montero as 	Magali
 Philippe Nicaud as Le guitariste
 Georges Flamant as Zacco
 Pierre Sergeol		
 Made Siamé	
 Henri Marchand	
 Fanny Mauve		
 Bob Ingarao		
 Catherine Gay		
 Liane Marlene
 Isabelle Eber

References

Bibliography 
 Parish, James Robert & Pitts, Michael R. The Great Spy Pictures. Scarecrow Press, 1974.

External links 
 

1953 films
French thriller films
1950s thriller films
1950s French-language films
Films based on French novels
Lux Film films
Films shot at Victorine Studios
1950s French films